Common names: Arafura File snake, Elephant Trunk Snake or wrinkle file snake.
Acrochordus arafurae is an aquatic snake species found in northern Australia and New Guinea. No subspecies are currently recognized.

This snake was first described by Samuel Booker McDowell in 1979

Description
Adults grown to 8.25 ft (2.5 m) in length. They have amazingly loose skin and are known to prey on large fish, such as eel-tailed catfish. Females are usually larger than males and they have been known to give birth to up to 17 young. The skin is used to make drums in New Guinea.

In Aboriginal language and culture

The indigenous peoples of northern Australia often hunt these snakes as they are quite common. As the snakes are near immobilized without the support of water the hunters merely throw each newly caught snake on the bank and continue hunting until they have enough.

In the Kunwinjku language of West Arnhem Land, the snakes are known as kedjebe (or bekka in Eastern dialects), while in the Yolŋu language of East Arnhem Land they are called djaykuŋ, among other names.

References

External links
 Acrochordus.com
 
 Arafura Filesnakes at Life is Short but Snakes are Long

Acrochordidae
Snakes of Australia
Reptiles of Western New Guinea
Reptiles of Papua New Guinea
Reptiles described in 1979
Snakes of New Guinea

ru:Яванская бородавчатая змея